Neustadt is a municipality in the Vogtlandkreis district, in Saxony, Germany.

The mountain of Bezelberg lies within the municipality.

References 

Vogtlandkreis